Nastassia Marachkouskaya (Łacinka: Nastassia Maračkoŭskaja; born ) is a Belarusian female artistic gymnast and a member of the national team.  She was born in Minsk. 

She competed at the 2008 Olympics and 2012 Summer Olympics in London, United Kingdom, and the 2011 World Artistic Gymnastics Championships.

References

External links

1990 births
Living people
Belarusian female artistic gymnasts
Gymnasts at the 2012 Summer Olympics
Olympic gymnasts of Belarus
Gymnasts at the 2008 Summer Olympics

Gymnasts from Minsk